VIP Tires and Service, previously known as VIP Parts, Tires andService, before the auto part business segment purchase by O'Reilly Auto Parts in December 2012. Prior to the O'Reilly purchase, VIP was the largest independently owned automotive aftermarket company in New England and the 14th largest in the United States.  

Founded in 1958, VIP Tires and Service is based in Auburn, Maine, the fifth (2018) largest city in the state. In September 2001, VIP was purchased by Quirk Tires and Service. Quirk Tires was founded by Edward S. Quirk in 1926 in Watertown, Massachusetts, and is one of the oldest tire dealers in the United States. VIP is now headed by John P. Quirk, Edward's grandson, who serves as President and CEO of the company. 

As of October 2021, VIP has 65 stores in Maine, New Hampshire, Massachusetts and Vermont.

In 2008 VIP Tires & Service received the Polk Inventory Efficiency Award in the retailer/distributor category for advanced product control technology. The Polk Inventory Efficiency Award, presented by R.L. Polk & Co., recognizes and rewards outstanding aftermarket companies for process improvements relative to inventory efficiency.

In 2018 VIP Tires & Service Owner and CEO, John Quirk, was named "Independent Tire Dealer of the Year" by Modern Tire Dealer Magazine.

From 1981–2007 VIP Tires and Service sponsored a one-day event held at the Oxford Plains Speedway in Oxford, Maine. The event was the largest single day car show in northern New England. The event combined a car show with a drag race and drew fans of show cars from classic muscle cars to Corvettes and customized tuner cars as well as trucks and motorcycles.

References

External links
 VIP Tires and Service

New England
Economy of the Northeastern United States
American companies established in 1926
Retail companies established in 1926
Automotive part retailers of the United States
Automotive repair shops of the United States
Companies based in Lewiston, Maine
Companies based in Maine
1926 establishments in Maine